Infant Jesus School may refer to:

 Infant Jesus School, Kalibo
 Infant Jesus School, Thiruvambady
 Infant Jesus School, Saharanpur